A kymograph (from Greek κῦμα, swell or wave + γραφή, writing; also called a kymographion) is an analog device that draws a graphical representation of spatial position over time in which a spatial axis represents time. It basically consists of a revolving drum wrapped with a sheet of paper on which a stylus moves back and forth recording perceived changes of phenomena such as motion or pressure.

The kymograph was initially a mechanical and hydraulic device, invented by German physiologist Carl Ludwig in the 1840s, and found its first use as a means to monitor blood pressure. The blood pressure was conveyed by hydraulics and levers to move a stylus that scratched a white trace into soot-covered paper on the revolving drum. Time is represented by the drum's rotation rate, and was recorded by a further stylus driven by a clock or tuning fork. The kymograph almost immediately became the central instrument in physiology and physiology education. Throughout the nineteenth and twentieth centuries, researchers and technicians devised many improvements to the device, plus numerous new sensory components to measure a wide range of physiological phenomena such as breathing, muscle movement, speech. New detection and registration systems included electrical and electronic methods, and plotted in ink.
 
Kymographs were also used outside medical science to measure atmospheric pressure, tuning fork vibrations, the functioning of steam engines, animal habits and the movement of molecules in cells.

Kymography in experimental physiology 
The kymograph is generally used to study the effects of xenobiotics on tissue preparations. It is a standalone recording apparatus used alongside other apparatuses such as organ baths. Writing levers are used to trace the recording from muscle contractions. Some of the commonly used writing levers are the simple lever, the frontal writing lever and the starling heart lever. These writing levers are connected to a fulcrum which is found on a secondary apparatus.

See also
 Videokymography
 Depth kymography

References

Medical imaging